The Colombia bid for the 2023 FIFA Women's World Cup was a unsuccessful bid to host the 2023 FIFA Women's World Cup by Colombian Football Federation. The single bid was announced on 12 December 2019. The bid entailed playing at 10 venues in 10 host cities, with the final held at the Estadio El Campín in Bogotá.

Background
In 2016 the Colombian Football Federation indicated an interest to formalize the candidacy of Colombia as host country. Colombia previously hosted the 2011 FIFA U-20 World Cup and the 2016 FIFA Futsal World Cup. One of the requirements to host the World Cup is to have a national women's league, and in 2017 the Colombian Women's Football League played its first season. On 26 January 2019, Colombian President Iván Duque Márquez indicated that he had every intention of applying for Colombia to host the 2023 Women's World Cup.

Proposed venues
The following host cities, venues and capacities were included in the Bid Book submitted to FIFA:

Result
Colombia was unsuccessful in its bid for the hosting rights to the 2023 FIFA Women's World Cup on 25 June 2020. In a vote of 35 eligible members of the FIFA Council, the bid received 13 votes to Australia and New Zealand's 22. Council members from CONMEBOL and UEFA voted for the bid. FIFA President Gianni Infantino voted for the Australia-New Zealand bid, alongside all council members from the Asian and Oceanian confederations, as well as those from CONCACAF and the Confederation of African Football.

References

2023 FIFA Women's World Cup bids
Football in Colombia